The Masonic Building, also called the Burrows Block, Bank Block, and Masonic Temple stands on the public square
in Osceola, Iowa, United States. It was constructed by banker A.H. Burrows in 1872. The upper stories of this Italianate building were used by Osceola Lodge No. 77 of the Ancient Free & Accepted Masons, and the main floor was a bank and hardware store. This building has been placed on Preservation Iowa’s Most Endangered list because of its poor repair and lack of preservation plan.
 It was individually listed on the National Register of Historic Places in 2010. In 2018 it was included as a contributing property in the Osceola Commercial Historic District.

References

Masonic buildings completed in 1872
Masonic buildings in Iowa
Osceola, Iowa
Italianate architecture in Iowa
Buildings and structures in Clarke County, Iowa
Clubhouses on the National Register of Historic Places in Iowa
National Register of Historic Places in Clarke County, Iowa
Individually listed contributing properties to historic districts on the National Register in Iowa